Henry Eyring (February 20, 1901 – December 26, 1981) was a Mexico-born United States theoretical chemist whose primary contribution was in the study of chemical reaction rates and intermediates.
Eyring developed the Absolute Rate Theory or Transition state theory of chemical reactions, connecting the fields of chemistry and physics through atomic theory, quantum theory, and statistical mechanics.

History
Eyring, a third-generation member of the Church of Jesus Christ of Latter-day Saints (LDS Church), was reared on a cattle ranch in Colonia Juárez, Chihuahua, a Mormon colony, for the first 11 years of his life. His father, Edward Christian Eyring, practiced plural marriage; Edward married Caroline Romney (1893) and her sister Emma Romney (1903), both daughters of Miles Park Romney, the great-grandfather of Mitt Romney.

In July 1912, the Eyrings and about 4,200 other immigrants were driven out of Mexico by violent insurgents during the Mexican Revolution and moved to El Paso, Texas. After living in El Paso for approximately one year, the Eyrings relocated to Pima, Arizona, where he completed high school and showed a special aptitude for mathematics and science. He also studied at Gila Academy in Thatcher, Arizona, now Eastern Arizona College. One of the pillars at the front of the main building still bears his name, along with that of his sister Camilla's husband, Spencer W. Kimball, later president of the LDS Church.

Eyring earned a BS in mining engineering at the University of Arizona by working in a copper mine. He then received a fellowship from the US Bureau of Mines fellowship and earned his M.Sc. in metallurgy. Having seen the high rates of accidents in the mines, and breathed sulfur fumes from blast furnaces at a smelter, he chose to do his Ph.D. in  chemistry. He pursued and received his doctoral degree in Chemistry from the University of California, Berkeley in 1927 for a thesis on A Comparison of the Ionization by, and Stopping Power for, Alpha Particles of Elements and Compounds.

Princeton University recruited Eyring as an instructor in 1931. He would continue his work at Princeton until 1946. In 1946 he was offered a position as dean of the graduate school at the University of Utah, with professorships in chemistry and metallurgy. The chemistry building on the University of Utah campus is now named in his honor.

A prolific writer, Eyring authored more than 600 scientific articles, ten scientific books, and a few books on the subject of science and religion. He received the Wolf Prize in Chemistry in 1980 and the National Medal of Science in 1966 for developing the Absolute Rate Theory or Transition state theory of chemical reactions, one of the most important developments of 20th-century chemistry.

Several other chemists later received the Nobel Prize for work based on the Absolute Rate Theory, and his failure to receive the Nobel was a matter of surprise to many. The Nobel Prize organization admitted that "Strangely, Eyring never received a Nobel Prize"; the Royal Swedish Academy of Sciences apparently did not understand Eyring's theory until it was too late to award him the Nobel. The academy awarded him the Berzelius Medal in 1977 as partial compensation. Sterling M. McMurrin believed Eyring should have received the Nobel Prize but was not awarded it because of his religion.

Eyring was elected president of the American Chemical Society in 1963 and the Association for the Advancement of Science in 1965.

Personal life 
Eyring married Mildred Bennion. She was a native of Granger, Utah, who had a degree from the University of Utah and served as head of the physical education department there. She met Eyring while pursuing a doctorate at the University of Wisconsin. They had three sons together. The oldest, Edward M. "Ted" Eyring was an emeritus professor of chemistry at the University of Utah. The second son, Henry B. Eyring is a general authority of the LDS Church, while the youngest son Harden B. Eyring is a higher education administrator for the State of Utah.  His wife, Mildred, died June 25, 1969, in Salt Lake City, Utah.  On August 13, 1971, he married Winifred Brennan in the LDS Church's Salt Lake Temple.

Eyring was a member of the LDS Church throughout his life. His views of science and religion were captured in this quote: "Is there any conflict between science and religion? There is no conflict in the mind of God, but often there is conflict in the minds of men." Eyring also feared overeager defenders of faith would discard new scientific findings because of apparent contradictions. He encouraged parents and teachers to distinguish between "what they know to be true and what they think may be true," to avoid clumping them together and "throwing the baby out with the bath."

As a member of the LDS Church, Eyring served as a branch president, district president, and, for over twenty years, a member of the general board of the Deseret Sunday School Union. His son, Henry B. Eyring, is currently an apostle and member of the church's First Presidency.

Awards 

 AAAS Newcomb Cleveland Prize (1932)
 Bingham Medal (1949) of the Society of Rheology
 Peter Debye Award in Physical Chemistry (1964)
 National Medal of Science (1966)
 Irving Langmuir Award (1967)
 Linus Pauling Award (1969)
 Elliott Cresson Medal (1969) from the Franklin Institute
 Golden Plate Award of the American Academy of Achievement (1974)
 T. W. Richards Medal (1975)
 Priestley Medal (1975)
 Berzelius Medal (1979)
 Wolf Prize (1980)
 Member of International Academy of Quantum Molecular Science
 Member of U.S. National Academy of Sciences

Scientific publications: books 

Henry Eyring authored, co-authored, or edited the following books or journals:
 A generalized theory of plasticity involving the virial theorem
 The activated complex in chemisorption and catalysis
 An examination into the origin, possible synthesis, and physical properties of diamonds
 Annual Review of Physical Chemistry
 Basic chemical kinetics
 Deformation Kinetics with Alexander Stephen Krausz
 Electrochemistry
 Kinetic evidence of phase structure
 Modern Chemical Kinetics
 Non-classical reaction kinetics
 Physical Chemistry, an Advanced Treatise (1970)
 Quantum Chemistry
 Reactions in condensed phases
 The significance of isotopic reactions in rate theory
 Significant Liquid Structures
 Some aspects of catalytic hydrogenation
 Statistical Mechanics
 Statistical Mechanics and Dynamics
 Theoretical Chemistry: Advances and Perspectives. Volume 2
 The Theory of Rate Processes in Biology and Medicine with Frank H. Johnson and Betsy Jones Stover
 Theory of Optical Activity (Monographs on Chemistry series) with D.J. Caldwell
 Time and Change
 Valency

Religious publications: books 
 Reflections of a Scientist (1983)
 The Faith of a Scientist. Bookcraft, Inc. (1967)
 Science and your Faith in God. Bookcraft, Inc. (1958)

See also 
 Eyring equation
 Mormon Scientist: The Life and Faith of Henry Eyring

References

External links 
The Chemistry Department:1946-2000 by Edward M. Eyring, April K. Heiselt, & Kelly Erickson (University of Utah)
Mini-Biography of Henry Eyring
Henry Eyring papers, MS 8 at the University of Utah
Henry Eyring speeches, MSS SC 586 at L. Tom Perry Special Collections, Brigham Young University
"The Reconciliation of Faith and Science: Henry Eyring's Achievement" - 1982 article on Eyring as an LDS scientist from Dialogue: A Journal of Mormon Thought

1901 births
1981 deaths
American leaders of the Church of Jesus Christ of Latter-day Saints
Eastern Arizona College alumni
Members of the International Academy of Quantum Molecular Science
Mexican chemists
Mexican emigrants to the United States
Mexican leaders of the Church of Jesus Christ of Latter-day Saints
National Medal of Science laureates
People from Colonia Juárez, Chihuahua
American physical chemists
Romney family
Princeton University faculty
Rheologists
Theoretical chemists
University of Arizona alumni
UC Berkeley College of Chemistry alumni
University of Utah faculty
Wolf Prize in Chemistry laureates
Sunday School (LDS Church) people
Latter Day Saints from Arizona
Latter Day Saints from Utah
Latter Day Saints from New Jersey
Annual Reviews (publisher) editors